The Intergovernmental Committee on Intellectual Property and Genetic Resources, Traditional Knowledge and Folklore (IGC, or IGC-GRTKF) in charge of negotiating one or several international legal instruments (treaty) to protect traditional knowledge, traditional cultural expressions, and genetic resources in relation with intellectual property, thus bridging existing gaps in international law. The IGC is convened in Geneva by the World Intellectual Property Organization (WIPO), and has been meeting since 2001.

History and mandate 

The IGC was established in 2001 by the General Assembly of WIPO, which reviews, updates, and extends the mandate of the IGC every 2 years at the Assembly's September meetings.

The IGC had a first diplomatic crisis in 2003, as "the enormity of its task was becoming clearer, as was the gulf in expectations among states as to the IGC's overall purpose and anticipated outcomes." The crisis lasted until 2009, when WIPO Assembly "agreed on a much-strengthened mandate" for the IGC, asking it to draft a legal instrument towards the convening of a Diplomatic Conference to adopt one or several treaties.

Since 2010, the mandate of the IGC has remained mostly unchanged: to conclude a consensual text which would bridge the gaps between the numerous existing international legal instruments provide some, but insufficient protection on either traditional knowledge, traditional cultural expressions, or genetic resources (UNDRIP, Convention on Biological Diversity, Nagoya Protocol, FAO plant treaty, UNESCO conventions on culture and intangible heritage, etc.), none of which include explicit protections for indigenous peoples and local communities.

IGC's negotiations were suspended is 2020 because of the pandemic of Severe acute respiratory syndrome coronavirus 2, resuming in 2022.

Work 

The IGC convened an Indigenous panel at every meeting, and created the WIPO Voluntary Fund for Member States to fund the active participation and involvement of indigenous communities and civil society stakeholders.

A number of documents have been issued to guide the works of the IGC, including a series of Background brief documents, as well as guidelines and other information documents.

The IGC has also developed draft international legal instruments on traditional knowledge, traditional cultural expressions, and genetic resources.

References

External links 

 
 IGC: What is happening now?
 Background brief: Origins, rationale and achievements of the IGC (available also in Arabic, Chinese, French, Português, Russian, and Spanish)
 Wendland, Wend (February 2022). International negotiations on Indigenous knowledge to resume at WIPO: a view of the journey so far and the way ahead. WIPO Magazine, Article 001.
 

Indigenous peoples
Intellectual property law
International trade organizations
Oral tradition
 
United Nations organizations based in Geneva
World Intellectual Property Organization